"Sasuke" is a song by American rapper Lil Uzi Vert. It was released on April 24, 2020 and serves as the lead single of their upcoming third studio album. It peaked at number 65 on the Billboard Hot 100.

The track's title is a reference to the Naruto character Sasuke, which Uzi also references multiple times in the track. The track is their first single as a lead artist since the release of his album Lil Uzi Vert vs. the World 2, which was released on March 13, 2020, and is the deluxe edition of their second studio album Eternal Atake, which was released a week earlier.

Critical reception 
The track received mixed-to-negative reviews. Diego Ramos of Daily Trojan gave the track two stars out of five, saying that the track "falls short of expectations", and said that the song "does have a [Playboi] Carti-esque nature, but it also sounds like a generic Uzi song", with "references to fashion, sexual innuendos and cars in the typical Uzi delivery" that "make for nothing special". Marcus Pruitt of AudiblWav said that the track "doesn’t bring quite the same punch as other tracks [they] released earlier this year", saying that the song "opened up with a ton of potential, but fell flat as it progressed". The song also garnered negative reactions from fans.

Commercial performance 
The track debuted at number 65 on the Billboard Hot 100, failing to match the previous commercial success of their previous single, "That Way".

Controversy 
The track was the subject of controversy between their beef with rapper Playboi Carti, with Uzi allegedly dissing him on the track. They denied dissing Carti.

Charts

References 

2020 singles
2020 songs
Lil Uzi Vert songs
Songs about fictional male characters
Songs written by Lil Uzi Vert